Jaak Joala (26 June 1950 – 25 September 2014) was an Estonian singer, musician and a member of two bands: Kristallid and Virmalised. He began as a flautist, later adding singing and bass guitar.

Biography

Early life
Jaak Joala was born in Viljandi, Estonia and grew up in Tallinn. His mother, Helgi Ridamäe, was a music teacher at various schools in Tallinn. His father was Arno Joala, who was a musician and who was later also known as a healer. When Jaak turned seven years old, he started to take piano lessons and in adolescence also began taking flute lessons.

Career
Joala is considered a music legend by some.

He began his musical career with the beat group Kristallid (English: The Crystals) in 1966 as a flautist, then as a singer and bassist. In 1968, he was the bassist and lead singer in the popular group Virmalised (English: Northern Lights). With Virmalised, he sang several of Toivo Kurmet's songs: Ainult sul (Only You Have), Ma ei tea, miks (I Don't Know Why), Naer (Laughter), Taas on päev (Once Again The Day) and Üksinda (Alone). Joala introduced western rock music to Estonian and Soviet audiences by singing in his native language.

In the 1980s, he earned the nickname Kremlin's Nightingale because he often performed and recorded in Russia, and a large part of his repertoire, comprising songs written by such great composers as Raimonds Pauls, David Tukhmanov and Alexander Zatsepin, at that time was sung in Russian.

Joala's bandmate Paap Kõlar recounted that eventually Joala grew tired of performing, saying that Goskontsert, the Soviet entertainment agency, demanded that he perform. Kõlar suggested that Joala did not have much choice as to whether to perform or not.

Later career
In the 1990s, Joala's most well-known projects as a singer were with Kollane Allveelaev G (English: Yellow Submarine G). They performed 1960s music along with Ivo Linna, Karl Madis, Meelis Punder and others. In the middle of the 1990s he performed in joint concerts with Ivo Linna and Tõnis Mägi. The concert tour was informally nicknamed The Three Tenors Tour. After the 1990s Joala devoted his time to teaching, producing and hosting on TV/radio. In the last ten years of his life he was largely reclusive.

Death 
He died on 25 September 2014. He was buried in the Forest Cemetery of Tallinn.

Popular songs
 I'm Drawing You
 Pick Мusic
 Lavanda (duet with Sofia Rotaru)
 Photos of the Loved Оnes 
 Wedding Horses

Acknowledgements
Merited Artist of the Estonian SSR (1980)

References

External links

 Estonian comedian Hendrik Normann parodies Jaak Joala in his comedy show.(Video)
 

1950 births
2014 deaths
20th-century Estonian male singers
Estonian flautists
Estonian rock singers
Estonian rock musicians
People from Viljandi
Burials at Metsakalmistu
Recipients of the Order of the White Star, 4th Class
20th-century flautists